Jorge Chávez No. 1 was a Peruvian football club, located in the city of Lima. The club was founded with the name of club Jorge Chávez Nr. 1 in honor to the Peruvian aviator Jorge Chávez and played in Primera Division Peruana from 1912 until 1929. The club won the national tournament in 1913.

Honours

National

League
Peruvian Primera División: 1
Winners (1): 1913
Runner-up (1): 1916

National cups
Copa de Campeones del Perú: 0
Runner-up (1): 1919

See also
List of football clubs in Peru
Peruvian football league system

External links
 La difusión del fútbol en Lima (Spanish)
 RSSSF - Peru - List of Champions
 Peruvian football seasons

Football clubs in Lima